DWI may refer to driving under the influence,  driving while intoxicated by alcohol or impaired by other drugs.

Other meanings include:

Dwi-, a prefix formerly used for undiscovered chemical elements
 Diffusion-weighted imaging,  in magnetic resonance imaging
 Drinking Water Inspectorate, England and Wales